FC Sucleia  is a Moldovan football club from Sucleia. Their home matches are played in Ceadîr-Lunga.

Honours
Divizia B
Winners (1): 2019

References

External links
FC Sucleia on Soccerway.com

Football clubs in Moldova
Association football clubs established in 2018
2018 establishments in Moldova